Tamás Molnár (born August 2, 1975) is a Hungarian former water polo player, who played on the gold medal squads at the 2000 Summer Olympics, 2004 Summer Olympics and 2008 Summer Olympics. He is one of ten male athletes who won three Olympic gold medals in water polo. He made his debut for the national team in 1997, and was named Hungarian Water Polo Player of the Year in 1998.

He won the Malta Waterpolo Summer League title with Neptunes Emirates (St. Julians, MALTA) in 2010-14. With this he earned a national record of winning 5 leagues in succession for the club previously unachieved by any other team, making him one of the most successful foreign players for the club as well as to play in the country in the sports local history.

Honours

National
 Olympic Games:  Gold medal - 2000, 2004, 2008
 World Championships:  Gold medal - 2003;  Silver medal - 1998, 2005, 2007
 European Championship:  Gold medal - 1997, 1999;  Silver medal - 2006;  Bronze medal - 2001, 2003, 2008
 FINA World League:  Gold medal - 2003, 2004;  Bronze medal - 2002
 FINA World Cup:  Gold medal - 1999;  Silver medal - 2002, 2006;  Bronze medal - 1997
 Universiade: (Silver medal - 1995)
 Junior World Championships: (Gold medal - 1995)
 Junior European Championship: (Gold medal - 1992, 1994)

Club
Újpest (UTE-Taxi 2000)
 LEN Cup (1x): 1998–99

Jug Dubrovnik
  Croatian Championship (1x): 1999–2000
 LEN Cup (1x): 1999–2000

Bečej
  FR Yugoslav Championship (1x): 2000–01
 FR Yugoslav Cup (1x): 2000–01

Bp. Honvéd (Domino-BHSE)
 Hungarian Championship (5x): 2001–02, 2002–03, 2003–04, 2004–05, 2005–06
 Hungarian Cup (1x): 2006
 Hungarian Super Cup (1x): 2005
 LEN Euroleague (1x): 2003–04
 LEN Super Cup (1x): 2004

Szeged (A-HÍD Szeged, Diapolo Szeged)
 Hungarian Cup (3x): 2011, 2012, 2013

Neptunes - only in Summer League
 Maltese Summer League (5x): 2010, 2011, 2012, 2013, 2014
 Maltese Knockout title (3x): 2011, 2012, 2014
 Maltese President's Cup (3x): 2011, 2013, 2014

Individual
 OB I top scorer (Hungarian Championship): 2009–10

Awards
 Masterly youth athlete: 1995
 Member of the Hungarian team of year: 1997, 1999, 2000, 2003, 2004, 2008
 Hungarian Water Polo Player of the Year: 1998
 Honorary Citizen of Budapest (2008)
 Member of International Swimming Hall of Fame (2015)

Orders
   Officer's Cross of the Order of Merit of the Republic of Hungary (2000)
   Commander's Cross of the Order of Merit of the Republic of Hungary (2004)
   Commander's Cross of the Order of Merit of the Republic of Hungary with the Star (2008)

See also
 Hungary men's Olympic water polo team records and statistics
 List of multiple Olympic gold medalists in one event
 List of Olympic champions in men's water polo
 List of Olympic medalists in water polo (men)
 List of world champions in men's water polo
 List of World Aquatics Championships medalists in water polo
 List of members of the International Swimming Hall of Fame

References

External links
 

1975 births
Living people
Sportspeople from Szeged
Hungarian male water polo players
Water polo centre forwards
Water polo players at the 2000 Summer Olympics
Water polo players at the 2004 Summer Olympics
Water polo players at the 2008 Summer Olympics
Medalists at the 2000 Summer Olympics
Medalists at the 2004 Summer Olympics
Medalists at the 2008 Summer Olympics
Olympic gold medalists for Hungary in water polo
World Aquatics Championships medalists in water polo
Universiade medalists in water polo
Universiade silver medalists for Hungary